Han Sui (140s - June or July 215), courtesy name Wenyue, was a military general and minor warlord who lived during the late Eastern Han dynasty of China. For most of his life, he was active in Liang Province (涼州; covering parts of present-day Shaanxi and Gansu) and was involved in several rebellions against the Han government and the warlord Cao Cao.

Life

With the backing of the Qiang people who populated much of Liang Province, Han Sui participated in the Liang Province Rebellion against the Han dynasty during the rule of Emperor Ling. He joined forces with others in the area, such as Bian Zhang, Beigong Yu (北宫玉) and Liwen Hou (李文侯). Despite suffering a defeat by government forces under Dong Zhuo, Han Sui maintained the support of the Qiang people and maintained his territory in Liang Province. Han Sui is thought to have preferred to remain somewhat behind the scenes, placing someone else in the position of leadership while holding real power himself. When Bian Zhang and the other leaders passed from the scene, he placed Wang Guo (王國) in power with the help of his ally Ma Teng, whom he pledged a pact of brotherhood with. The arrangement did not last long, however, and Wang Guo was removed from power after being defeated by the Han general Huangfu Song. It was at this point that Ma Teng and Han Sui declared themselves co-rulers of Liang Province, now mostly autonomous due to turmoil in the Han dynasty.

Early in 192, the two of them submitted to the Han central government, then under Dong Zhuo's control, but Dong Zhuo was assassinated by Lü Bu and Wang Yun in April. After Li Jue, Guo Si and other former followers of Dong Zhuo seized control of the Han central government later that year, Han Sui and Ma Teng allied themselves with Liu Yan and led their armies to attack the Han imperial capital, Chang'an. After suffering a major defeat 13 miles west of Chang'an, and running short on supplies, the warlords retreated back to Liang Province.

Not long afterwards, however, Han Sui and Ma Teng's relationship soured and the two of them battled each other for control of Liang Province. Their battle escalated to the point where both were killing each other's wives and children. Cao Cao, having achieved victory at the Battle of Guandu in 200CE, sent Zhong Yao to broker a peace between the two sides and to place Liang Province under Cao Cao's authority. After the terms were agreed to, Han Sui and Ma Teng would give assistance to Cao Cao in the remainder of his battles against Yuan Shao. After this, Ma Teng was forcibly summoned to Ye and Han Sui placed Ma Teng's son Ma Chao in charge of Liang Province.

When Cao Cao began gathering armies with the intent of invading Hanzhong Commandery, then under the rule of Zhang Lu, Han Sui and Ma Chao suspected that it was they, and not Zhang Lu who would be attacked. The two of them gathered warlords from the western regions and went to war against Cao Cao. In the course of the conflict, however, Cao Cao managed to turn Ma Chao and Han Sui against each other. Han Sui realised that there was no hope for victory with the forces divided against each other in suspicion, and retreated once again to Liang Province. Cao Cao captured and killed Han Sui's children and grandchildren.

When Xiahou Yuan began his subjugation of Liang Province, Han Sui fought against this, but was ultimately defeated and forced to retreat. He discussed the idea of retreating to Yi Province (covering present-day Sichuan and Chongqing), but his subordinate Cheng Gongying encouraged him to continue his fight against Cao Cao instead. At this point, he was either murdered by some of his own followers or died of illness. In either case, his head was brought to Cao Cao by Han Sui's subordinates as they all surrendered. He was believed to have been over 70 years old at the time of his death.

In Romance of the Three Kingdoms
In the 14th-century historical novel Romance of the Three Kingdoms, Han Sui is depicted as Ma Teng's sworn brother and subordinate, when historically he was actually a warlord of equal footing as Ma Teng. Han Sui's preference to remain out of the scenes may have been a reason for this depiction.

In the novel, during Ma Chao's battles against Cao Cao's forces, Han Sui has eight elite officers serving under him. After Cao Cao successfully used a scheme to turn Ma Chao and Han Sui against each other, Ma Chao grew suspicious of Han Sui and attacked him, cutting off his left arm in the process. Han Sui managed to escape and defect to Cao Cao, who accepted his surrender and allowed him to continue serving as a general in Liang Province alongside Xiahou Yuan.

See also
 Lists of people of the Three Kingdoms

References

 Chen, Shou (3rd century). Records of the Three Kingdoms (Sanguozhi).
 
 Pei, Songzhi (5th century). Annotations to Records of the Three Kingdoms (Sanguozhi zhu).
 Sima, Guang (1084). Zizhi Tongjian.

2nd-century births
215 deaths
Ma Teng and associates

Han dynasty warlords